The 2018–19 Indiana State Sycamores women's basketball team represents Indiana State University during the 2018–19 NCAA Division I women's basketball season. The Sycamores, led by first year head coach Vicki Hall, play their home games at the Hulman Center and were members of the Missouri Valley Conference. They finished the season 11–19, 5–13 in MVC play to finish in eighth place. They lost in the first round of the Missouri Valley women's tournament to Valparaiso.

Roster

Schedule

|-
!colspan=9 style=| Non-conference regular season

|-
!colspan=9 style=| Missouri Valley Conference regular season

|-
!colspan=9 style=| Missouri Valley Women's Tournament

See also
2018–19 Indiana State Sycamores men's basketball team

References

Indiana State Sycamores women's basketball seasons
Indiana State
Indiana State
Indiana State